CGTN Arabic, formerly CCTV-Arabic, is an Arabic language television channel owned by China Global Television Network, a subsidiary of China Central Television.

History
On July 25, 2009, CCTV launched its Arabic-language international channel, stating that it aimed to maintain stronger links with Arabic nations and that the new channel will "serve as an important bridge to strengthen communication and understanding between China and Arab countries". CCTV also had plans for a Russian-language channel, which launched later in the year. The free-to-air channel was open for view to an audience of potentially 300 million in 22 countries, through the use of satellite television.

Development and funding
The South China Morning Post reported that CCTV was prepared to spend 45 billion yuan (US$9.5 billion) into the development of the channel, a claim unconfirmed by official sources.

Content
The channel broadcasts entirely in Arabic, with programs from the four categories of news, feature stories, entertainment and education. Each program is broadcast six times per day, while news reports are regularly updated. The channel will gradually increase the number of programs as it develops.

See also
 CCTV-4 (Chinese)
 CGTN Русский
 CGTN Français
 CGTN Español
 CGTN (TV channel)
 China Network Television (CNTV)

References

External links
  

China Global Television Network channels
Television channels and stations established in 2009
Arabic-language television stations
24-hour television news channels in China
2009 establishments in China